"The Diggers' Song" (also known as "Levellers and Diggers") is a 17th-century English ballad by Gerrard Winstanley, a protest song about land rights inspired by the Diggers movement. The lyrics were published in 1894 by the  Camden Society. It is sung to a version of the family of tunes later used for "Sam Hall", "Captain Kidd", and "Admiral John Benbow", which according to Roy Palmer was first printed in 1714. The English band Chumbawamba recorded a version of this song on their 1988 album English Rebel Songs 1381–1914.

According to Leon Rosselson his 1975 song "The World Turned Upside Down" (not to be confused with the 17th-century ballad of the same title) is not a version of "Diggers' Song". However, Rosselson later recorded a version of "The Diggers' Song" (under the title "You Noble Diggers All") using the traditional lyrics and tune on his album Harry's Gone Fishing.

Chumbawamba also released a version of Rosselson's composition on their 1993 single "Timebomb", sang "The Diggers' Song" in 1988 on their LP English Rebel Songs 1381–1914, and recorded it again in 2003 for the re-made CD English Rebel Songs 1381–1984. In 2007, they sang it on their live CD Get On With It – Live.

The song was selected by Tony Benn when he appeared on BBC Radio 4's Desert Island Discs on 15 January 1989.

Lyrics

See also 

 Levellers

References

Footnotes

Bibliography

External links

The English Diggers (1649–50)

17th-century ballads
Diggers
English ballads
English folk songs
Protest songs
Traditional ballads
Year of song unknown
Songwriter unknown